The Freedom Trail is a  path through Boston, Massachusetts, that passes by 16 locations significant to the history of the United States. Marked largely with brick, it winds from Boston Common in downtown Boston through the North End to the Bunker Hill Monument in Charlestown. Stops along the trail include simple explanatory ground markers, graveyards, notable churches and buildings, and a historic naval frigate. While most of the sites are free or suggest donations, the Old South Meeting House, the Old State House, and the Paul Revere House charge admission. The Freedom Trail is overseen by the City of Boston's Freedom Trail Commission and is supported in part by grants from various nonprofits and foundations, private philanthropy, and Boston National Historical Park.

The Freedom Trail was conceived by local journalist William Schofield, who in 1951 suggested building a pedestrian trail to link important local landmarks. Boston mayor John Hynes decided to put Schofield's idea into action. By 1953, 40,000 people were walking the trail annually.

The National Park Service operates a visitor's center on the first floor of Faneuil Hall, where they offer tours, provide free maps of the Freedom Trail and other historic sites, and sell books about Boston and United States history.

Some observers have noted the tendency of the Freedom Trail's narrative frame to omit certain historical locations, such as the sites of the Boston Tea Party and the Liberty Tree.

Official trail sites
The official trail sites are (generally from south-to-north):
 Boston Common
 Massachusetts State House
 Park Street Church
 Granary Burying Ground
 King's Chapel and King's Chapel Burying Ground
 Boston Latin School Site/Statue of Benjamin Franklin
 Old Corner Bookstore
 Old South Meeting House
 Old State House
 Boston Massacre Site
 Faneuil Hall
 Paul Revere House
 Old North Church
 Copp's Hill Burying Ground
 
 Bunker Hill Monument
The Black Heritage Trail crosses the Freedom Trail between the Massachusetts State House and Park Street Church. The Boston Irish Famine Memorial is also located along the Freedom Trail.

In popular culture 
The Freedom Trail is a part of many fictional pieces of media, such as Fallout 4, which requires players to walk along the Freedom Trail to find the faction The Railroad, whose headquarters are at the Old North Church.

References

Further reading

External links

 Freedom Trail Foundation
 The Black Heritage Trail 
 Boston National Historic Park
 The Boston Harbor Walk
 The Freedom Trail – Boy Scouts of America pamphlet
 1798 Map of Boston
 Clough's 1798 Atlas of Boston (circa 1900)
 1640 Map of Boston
 History of the Freedom Trail
 PDF Map of the Freedom Trail
 Mapping Boston History

1951 establishments in Massachusetts
Boston National Historical Park
Cultural history of Boston
Historic trails and roads in Massachusetts
Museology
Urban heritage trails
Tourist attractions in Boston